Before the Nazi German invasion of Poland in 1939, almost every Polish town had a synagogue or a Jewish house of prayer of some kind. The 1939 statistics recorded the total of 1,415 Jewish communities in the country just before the outbreak of war, each composed of at least 100 members (Gruber, 1995). Every one of them owned at least one synagogue and a Jewish cemetery nearby. Approximately 9.8% of all believers in Poland were Jewish (according to 1931 census).

The list of actives synagogues in Poland cannot possibly include the hundreds of synagogue buildings which still stand today in about 250 cities and towns across the country – seventy years after the Holocaust in Poland which claimed the lives of over 90% of Polish Jewry. Devoid of their original hosts, many synagogue buildings house libraries and smaller museums as in Kraków, Łańcut, Włodawa, Tykocin, Zamość, Radzanów, but many more serve as apartment buildings, shops, gyms and whatever else community needs require. This isn't bad however, because the synagogues which remain empty are usually worse off due to lack of maintenance.

Active synagogues in Poland
The Union of Jewish Religious Communities in Poland (ZGWŻ) with branches in nine metropolitan centres helps the descendants of the Holocaust survivors in the process of recovery and restoration of synagogue buildings once owned by the Jewish Kehilla (קהלה), and nationalized in Communist Poland. The list of active and rededicated synagogues in the country include:

 Warsaw
 Nożyk Synagogue
 Chabad Lubavitch Synagogue (pl)
 Beit Warszawa Synagogue - Związek Postępowych Gmin Żydowskich w Polsce
 Masorti Synagogue - Synagoga konserwatywna w Warszawie 
 Kraków 
 Remuh Synagogue
 Tempel Synagogue
 Izaak Synagogue
 See also Synagogues of Kraków for a more complete list of 124 synagogue buildings with description of selected historical monuments of Jewish sacred architecture in the city
 Łódź
 Reicher Synagogue (pl)
 Pomorska Street Synagogue (pl)
 Lublin
 Chewra Nosim (Chevrat Nossim) Synagogue (pl)
 Chachmei Lublin Yeshiva Synagogue (Yeshivat Chachamei Lublin) (pl)
 New Jewish Cemetery Synagogue (pl)
 Wrocław
 White Stork Synagogue
 Small Synagogue (pl)
 Gdańsk
 New Synagogue (pl)
 Oświęcim Synagogue (Chevrah Lomdei Mishnayot Synagogue, pl), Oświęcim
 Bajs Nusn (Beys Nusn) Synagogue (pl), Nowy Sącz
 Bobowa Synagogue (pl), Bobowa
 Leżajsk Synagogue (pl), Leżajsk
 Lelów Synagogue (pl), Lelów

 Bielsko-Biała Synagogue (pl), Bielsko-Biała
 Gliwice Synagogue (pl), Gliwice
 Katowice Synagogue (pl), Katowice
 Legnica Synagogue (pl), Legnica
 Poznań Synagogue, Poznań
 Szczecin Synagogue, Szczecin
 Wałbrzych Synagogue, Wałbrzych
 Żary Synagogue, Żary
 Włodawa Synagogue (Wlodowa Synagogue) in Włodawa

Notes

External links
 Chabad-Lubavitch Centers in Poland
 9 Illustrious Synagogues You Can Visit in Poland

Synagogues
Poland